|}

The Henry VIII Novices' Chase is a Grade 1 National Hunt steeplechase in Great Britain which is open to horses aged four years or older. It is run at Sandown Park over a distance of about 2 miles (1 mile 7 furlongs and 119 yards, or 3,126 metres), and during its running there are thirteen fences to be jumped. The race is for novice chasers, and it is scheduled to take place each year in early December.

The event is named after Henry VIII, who commandeered Esher (the location of Sandown Park) as a royal hunting ground in the sixteenth century. In its analysis of the 2007 running, the Racing Post described the Henry VIII Novices' Chase as: "A race that has a very high standing in the calendar thanks to the exploits of past winners and subsequent Grade 1 stars like Direct Route, Decoupage, Fondmort, Impek, Thisthatandtother, Contraband and Racing Demon." It was raised to Grade 1 status in 2011 having previously been contested at Grade 2 level.

Records
Leading jockey since 1987 (3 wins):
 Richard Dunwoody – Acre Hill (1990), Wonder Man (1992), Certainly Strong (1995) 

Leading trainer since 1987 (7 wins):
 Paul Nicholls – Dines (1998), Thisthatandtother (2003), Marodima (2007), Al Ferof (2011), Hinterland (2013), Vibrato Valtat (2014), Dynamite Dollars (2018)

Winners since 1987

See also
 Horse racing in Great Britain
 List of British National Hunt races

References
 Racing Post:

 pedigreequery.com – Henry VIII Novices' Chase – Sandown.

External links
 Race Recordings

National Hunt races in Great Britain
Sandown Park Racecourse
National Hunt chases